Novair International Airways was a British charter airline that operated between 1988 and 1990.

History
Novair International Airways was formed on 7 December 1988 following the sole acquisition of Cal Air International by the Rank Organisation.

Perhaps the main reason for this new name was the acquisition of British Caledonian by their main competitor British Airways. BA’s aim was to form a new charter subsidiary under the name of Caledonian Airways (1988). Concerns were raised between the names ‘Caledonian Airways’ and ‘Cal Air’ (essentially an abbreviation of the competition!).

Novair International offered charter flights to the popular Mediterranean, North African & Canary Islands as well as long haul services to Orlando & Fort Lauderdale Florida North America & Banjul West Africa. However the airline was always fighting against decreasing passenger numbers in addition to the Rank organisation losing interest in its travel/aviation subsidiaries. With the failure to find a suitable buyer, Novair International Airways ceased operations on 31 March 1990. The airline was finally wound up on 5 May 1990.The company was wound up in April 2012 according to data from Companies House.

Livery 
A predominantly white body with a red sash-like diagonal stripe incorporating large "Novair" titling. The tail logo had a large blue 5 pointed star stylised for speed.

Fleet 
Novair operated six aircraft during its two years of operation consisting of three McDonnell Douglas DC-10s inherited from Cal Air International.  These were joined by three Boeing 737s.

See also
 List of defunct airlines of the United Kingdom

References

External links

Defunct airlines of the United Kingdom
Airlines established in 1988
Airlines disestablished in 1990